Turbonomic is a resource-simulation software company headquartered in Boston, MA and owned by IBM.  The company was originally named VMTurbo.

Reception
In 2011, Gartner named Turbonomic as a Cool Vendor in Cloud Management. In 2016, Turbonomic was listed as the top product for Virtualization Management in a report by IDG and IT Central Station. Turbonomic has made five appearances to the Inc. 5000, and made the Forbes Cloud 100 four times. In 2020, Fast Company named Turbonomic to their Best Workplaces for Innovators List. The company was also deemed a Vendor to Watch in AIOps by Enterprise Management Associates (EMA) for its combination of abstraction, analytics, and automation engine that continually assures performance of a customer’s applications.

History
The company formed partnerships with Cisco and IBM, entering into OEM agreements to bring Application Resource Management to a larger customer base.

Since its founding in 2008 or 2009,  Turbonomic had raised more than $250M from venture capital firms including Bain Capital Ventures and Highland Capital Partners.

The company's product was updated in 2017 for use with cloud computing platforms.

The company was originally named VMTurbo and changed its name to Turbonomic in August 2017.

Turbonomic acquired ParkMyCloud and SevOne in 2019.

IBM acquired Turbonomic on June 17, 2021.   
The company's product simulates supply and demand forces in order to efficiently allocate resources such as computing, database, memory and storage.

References

Further reading

External links 
 
 
 
 
 

2008 establishments in Massachusetts
Business software companies
Cloud computing providers
Virtualization software
Companies based in Boston
American companies established in 2008
Software companies established in 2008
Software companies based in Massachusetts
Defunct software companies of the United States
2021 mergers and acquisitions
IBM acquisitions
IBM subsidiaries